The Taiwan Comprehensive University System, informally called Taiwan T4 Alliance, is a research-led university alliance in Taiwan.

In 2016, TCUS signed a memorandum of cooperation with TU9 in Germany.

Members 
 National Chung Cheng University
CCU, Chiayi County
The first suburban college town university in Taiwan.
 National Chung Hsing University
NCHU, Taichung
The largest comprehensive university in Central Taiwan.
 National Cheng Kung University 
NCKU, Tainan
The largest comprehensive university in Southern Taiwan.
 National Sun Yat-sen University
NSYSU, Kaohsiung
The first national comprehensive university in Southern Taiwan, is one of Sun Yat-sen Universities renowned as an official think tank scholars' community.

Rankings

See also
TU9
List of universities in Taiwan
 University alliances in Taiwan
National University System of Taiwan
University System of Taiwan
ELECT
European Union Centre in Taiwan
University System of Taipei

References

External links
Taiwan Comprehensive University System
 International Summer School at the Taiwan Comprehensive University System
Three universities in central and southern Taiwan forge alliance

University systems in Taiwan
Educational institutions established in 2012
2012 establishments in Taiwan